The Schomburgk's deer (Rucervus schomburgki) is an extinct species of deer once endemic to central Thailand. It was described by Edward Blyth in 1863 and named after Sir Robert H. Schomburgk, who was the British consul in Bangkok from 1857 to 1864. It is thought to have gone extinct by 1938, when the last records of the species were published.

Description

This deer was a graceful species, similar in appearance to the related barasingha (R. duvaucelii). The pelt was a dark brown with lighter underparts. The underside of the tail was white. Males possessed basket-like antlers, upon which all the main tines branched. Females had no antlers.

Habitat
Schomburgk's deer inhabited swampy plains with long grass, cane, and shrubs in central Thailand, particularly in the Chao Phraya River valley near Bangkok. This deer avoided dense vegetation. They lived in herds that consisted of a single adult male, a few females, and their young. However, during the flooding that occurred during the rainy season, the herds were forced together upon higher pieces of land which could turn into islands. This made them easy targets for hunters.

Extinction
Commercial production of rice for export began in the late-19th century in Thailand, leading to the loss of nearly all grassland and swamp areas on which this deer depended. Intensive hunting pressure at the turn of the century restricted the species further until it became extinct.

The wild population of Schomburgk's deer is thought to have died out because of overhunting by 1932, with the last captive individual being killed in 1938. The species was listed as extinct in the 2006 IUCN Red List of Threatened Species. However, some scientists consider this species to be still extant.

In 1991, antlers were discovered in a Chinese medicine shop in Laos. Laurent Chazée, an agronomist with the United Nations, later identified the antlers from a photograph he took as coming from Schomburgk's deer.
Only one mounted specimen is known to exist, which currently resides in Paris's Muséum national d'Histoire naturelle after living in the zoo there until 1868.

See also
List of extinct animals of Asia

References

External links
The Extinction Website - Species Info - Schomburgk's Deer
IUCN Red List of Threatened Species: Cervus schomburgki
Rare 'Extinct' Deer Might Still Be Around Today

Mammals of Thailand
Extinct mammals of Asia
Mammal extinctions since 1500
Cervines
Species made extinct by human activities
Endemic fauna of Thailand
Mammals described in 1863
Taxa named by Edward Blyth
Species endangered by habitat loss